Rathowen is a small village in County Westmeath, Ireland, on the N4 national primary route. Rathowen was designated as a census town by the Central Statistics Office for the first time in the 2016 census, at which time it had a population of 150 people.

The village is around 20 km northwest of Mullingar, 20 km southeast of Longford Town, and 100 km northwest of Dublin city centre.

Transport
Street and Rathowen railway station was opened on 1 August 1877 and finally closed on 17 June 1963.

See also
 List of towns and villages in Ireland

References

Towns and villages in County Westmeath